The castle of Alcalá del Júcar is of Almohad origin (12th and 13th centuries), located in the town of Alcalá del Júcar, in the province of Albacete, Spain, above the gorge of the Júcar river.

History
Castle of Almohad origin (12th and 13th centuries). It was, as other castles and lands in this area, occupied by Iberians, Romans, Arabs and Christians.

When Alfonso VIII of Castile conquered this land around the year 1213, the castle was occupied by Christians. Later in time, it belonged to Marquis of Villena.

Style
Its style is Islamic. There are three floors and has a pentagonal fortified tower and two circular little towers. Most of the wall that surrounded the castle have been destroyed over time, but some remains are still visible.

Legend
Around the castle there is the popular legend of Princess Zulema and intense and tragic love with the Moor who lived Garadar. One version says that the princess was claimed by Garad Christian, who held the Castle to make him renounce his faith and marry her. To escape his fate, committed suicide by throwing himself Zulema vacuum. The other legend tells of forbidden love of Zulema, this time a Muslim, a Christian gentleman. To escape the wrath of his parents settled in the present location of the nearby village called Zulema.

Current situation
 The castle is open to tourists.
 Declared a Historic-Artistic Site in 1982, was formerly Alcalá Jucar customs of the Camino Real de Castilla to the East.
 In 1986, it received the third prize, after the Eiffel Tower and the Grand Mosque in Istanbul, Best artistic lighting, organized by the Philips home according to the project by José Ángel Lucas Baidez.
 In 1994, the project Workshop II School Júcar Alcalá, was conditioned natural environment, improving its input.

Surroundings
The castle is near some other places of touristic interest such as Jorquera and Villa de Ves.

References

Castles in Castilla–La Mancha